HK Poprad is a professional ice hockey team in the Slovak Extraliga, the top ice hockey league in Slovakia. It plays its games in Poprad, Slovakia. The squad's greatest success was 2nd place in the Slovak Extraliga in 2006, 2011 and 2021. The club is nicknamed Kamzíci, which means "Chamois" in English.

History
After the dissolution of Czechoslovakia in 1993, Poprad started playing in the new independent Slovak Championship which was named the Slovak Extraliga. In the 1996–97 season Poprad was eliminated in the semifinals by HC Košice. In the next season 1997–98, they played semifinals again against HC Košice and lost 0–3. However, these two seasons were successful because the team won bronze medals. In the 2005–06 season the team reached the most remarkable success, but lost 3–4 in the final series against MsHK Žilina. This success was repeated in the 2010–11 season, when they played against the long-time rival HC Košice and lost 1–4 in the final.

Season-by-season record 
This is a partial list of the last eight seasons completed by HK Poprad.

Note: GP = Games played, W = Wins, OTW = Overtime/shootout wins, OTL = Overtime/shootout losses, L = Losses, Pts = Points, GF = Goals for, GA = Goals againstHonours

Domestic

Slovak Extraliga
  Runners-up (3): 2005–06, 2010–11, 2020–21
  3rd place (2): 1996–97, 1997–98

Czechoslovak Extraliga
  3rd place (1): 1937–38

Slovak Hockey League
  Runners-up (1): 1941–42
  3rd place (2): 1942–43, 1943–44

1st. Slovak National Hockey League
  Winners (4): 1969–70, 1980–81, 1984–85, 1990–91
  Runners-up (4): 1966–67, 1979–80, 1981–82, 1987–88
  3rd place (6): 1968–69, 1970–71, 1977–78, 1978–79, 1982–83, 1985–86

Pre-season
Tatra Cup
  Winners (13): 1936/1937, 1937/1938, 1938/1939, 1941/1942, 1946/1947, 1995, 2000, 2001, 2005, 2012, 2014, 2018, 2020

Players

Current roster

Retired numbers

Franchise scoring leaders
These are the top-ten-point-scorers in franchise history. Figures are updated after each completed regular season.
  – current Poprad playerNote: Pos = Position; GP = Games played; G = Goals; A = Assists; Pts = Points; P/G = Points per gameFranchise playoff scoring leaders
These are the top-ten playoff point-scorers in franchise playoff history. Figures are updated after each completed season.
  – current Poprad playerNote: Pos = Position; GP = Games played; G = Goals; A = Assists; Pts = Points; P/G = Points per game; * = current Poprad player''

NHL alumni

  Jamie Arniel (2022)
  Ľuboš Bartečko (1993–1994, 2010, 2014–2015)
  Peter Bondra (2004)
  Michal Handzuš (1996)
  Kevin Henderson (2016)
  Miroslav Ihnačák (1992, 2004)
  Brandon Mashinter (2021)
  Ladislav Nagy (2010)
  Andrej Nedorost (2011)
  Radoslav Suchý (1994, 2004–2005, 2010–2016)
  Tomáš Surový (2000)
  Ľubomír Vaic (1993–1994, 2011–2013)
  Kyle Wanvig (2010)

See also
Lev Poprad
Tatra Cup

References

External links
Official website 

 
Ice hockey teams in Slovakia
Ice hockey teams in Czechoslovakia
HK Poprad
Ice hockey clubs established in 1930
1930 establishments in Czechoslovakia